First Baptist Church of Brownsville is a historic church at 515 N. Main Street in Brownsville, Oregon.

It was built in 1907 and added to the National Register in 1991.

References

Baptist churches in Oregon
Churches on the National Register of Historic Places in Oregon
Carpenter Gothic church buildings in Oregon
Churches completed in 1907
National Register of Historic Places in Linn County, Oregon
Brownsville, Oregon